Pim Nieuwenhuis (born 23 December 1976, in Enkhuizen) is a sailor from the Netherlands. Nieuwenhuis as crew on the Dutch Tornado with Mitch Booth as helmsman took 5th place in the Tornado during the 2008 Olympics, in Qingdao.

Sailing career
Nieuwenhuis started in the optimist dinghy where he picked up the first racing skills. Soon he moved on to Olympic classes and started in the Tornado class in 1994. He was recruited by coach Roy Heiner as a talent for his big boat campaigns. After 5 years of big boat sailing Pim moved back again to sail Olympic classes, this time in the 49er, missing out on the 2004 Summer Olympics in Athens. Nieuwenhuis started a new Olympic campaign with Mitch Booth in the tornado in 2006.

Further reading

2008 Olympics (Qingdao)

References

Living people
1976 births
People from Enkhuizen
Dutch male sailors (sport)
Dutch windsurfers
Sailors at the 2008 Summer Olympics – Tornado
Olympic sailors of the Netherlands
Sportspeople from North Holland